The A3 highway is a highway in Lithuania (Magistralinis kelias). It runs from Vilnius to the Belarus border, reaching Minsk.

A3 highway is part of European route E28 in the European route system. The E28 highway ultimately connects Berlin with Minsk.

At the Belarusian border, the A3 connects with the road M7 that leads to Minsk. From Vilnius to the junction with the 106 land road, the road has from four to six lanes (two or three lanes in each direction).

Roads in Lithuania
European route E85